Julian Harvey "Jay" Swayze (27 October 1923 – 12 June 1981) was an architect from Plainview, Texas best known for his creation of Underground World Home at the 1964 New York World's Fair. During his career he was a promoter of underground living and he wrote a book called: Underground gardens & homes: The best of two worlds, above and below.

Early life 
He was married to Ruth (née Boren) Swayze and lived in Plainview, Texas with his wife and daughters in an underground home.

Career
In his professional life he began as a luxury homebuilder. The majority of his career was spent promoting underground homes. Swayze cited solid research stating that people did not look out of their windows 80% of the time. He said when people did look out their windows, half the time what they saw was undesirable. He claimed that he could give people better views with murals. 

In 1962 he designed an underground home he called the Atomitat. The home was designed during the cold war when Americans feared nuclear war. It was designed to be an "atomic habitat" which met civil defense specifications. He compared the Atomitat to a "ship in a bottle". There was a reinforced steel and concrete shell and it was 13 feet underground. The bunker had 4 bedrooms and 3 bathrooms and windows throughout which were meant to mimic outdoor scenes and outdoor lighting. 

He billed his underground homes as Peeping Tom proof, more fun, less expensive and a way to save space above ground. He billed his homes as "safe harbor". He referred to his underground home construction design as a “ship-in-a-bottle” design. 

He designed a home for the 1964 New York World's Fair and it was called the Underground World Home. The cost of the exhibit and home was one million dollars. Swayze was not able to make any sales of his underground homes from the fair exhibit. The home was designed for the company "Underground World Homes" which was owned by Avon investor (millionaire) Girard B. Henderson. Swayze built a  underground home for millionaire Girard B. Henderson in Las Vegas. The home had a swimming pool, a hot tub, and a generator. In 1996 the home was put up for sale for 8 million dollars.

In 1980 he wrote a book promoting the underground living called Underground gardens & homes: The best of two worlds, above and below.

Death 
Swayze suffered a heart attack 11 June 1981 while riding in car with one of his employees. He was transported by ambulance to High Plains Baptist Hospital in Amarillo, Texas and he arrived in critical condition. He died in the hospital the next day.

References

External links 

Find a Grave
Video tour of Girard B. Henderson's Swayze designed underground home

1923 births
1981 deaths
Architects from Texas
20th-century American architects
People from Plainview, Texas